Simona Koch (born May 27, 1968, in Berlin) is a retired diver from Germany, who competed for her native country at two Summer Olympics, in 1992 and 1996. She was affiliated with the Berliner Turn- und Sportclub in Berlin. Koch won two medals at the 1993 European Championships.

References
 sports-reference

1968 births
Living people
German female divers
Divers at the 1992 Summer Olympics
Divers at the 1996 Summer Olympics
Olympic divers of Germany
Sportspeople from Berlin
20th-century German women